Events from the year 1755 in France

Incumbents
 Monarch – Louis XV

Events
Opéra national de Montpellier established
Action of 8 June 1755

Births

Full date missing
1 April – Jean Anthelme Brillat-Savarin, lawyer, politician and essayist (died 1826)
16 April – Élisabeth-Louise Vigée-Le Brun, French painter (died 1842)
2 November – Maria Antonia, Austrian Habsburg princess who would later marry the incumbent King Louis XVs grandson, Prince Louis-Auguste (the future Louis XVI). (died 1793)
16 November – Maximin Isnard, revolutionary (died 1825)
17 November – Prince Louis Stanislaus, grandson of the reigning King Louis XV and future Louis XVIII. (died 1824)

Deaths

Full date missing
Jean-Baptiste Oudry, painter, engraver and tapestry designer (born 1686)
Jacques Caffieri, sculptor (born 1678)
Joseph Bodin de Boismortier, composer (born 1689)
Jean-Pierre Christin, physicist, mathematician, astronomer and musician (born 1683)
Jean-Louis Lemoyne, sculptor (born 1665)
Gabrielle-Suzanne Barbot de Villeneuve, writer (born c.1695)
Joseph-Nicolas-Pancrace Royer, composer (born c.1705)
Jean Marie, Duke of Châteauvillain, nobleman (born 1748)
Philip François Renault, explorer (born c.1686)

See also

References

1750s in France